Lorenzo Baldissera Tiepolo (8 August 1736 – August 1776) was an artist and son of the more famous Giovanni Battista Tiepolo. In 1750, he travelled to Würzburg with his father and brother, Giovanni Domenico Tiepolo, where he worked alongside them on the decorative fresco cycle in the Würzburg Residence. A number of drawings have been attributed to him from these apprentice years.

References

External links

Giambattista Tiepolo, 1696-1770, a full text exhibition catalog from The Metropolitan Museum of Art

1736 births
1776 deaths
18th-century Italian painters
Italian male painters
Rococo painters
Painters from Venice
18th-century Italian male artists